is a Japanese voice actress and singer from Tokyo who is affiliated with Haikyō. She debuted in 2015, playing the role of Sanae Katagiri in the video game The Idolmaster Cinderella Girls. She is also known for her roles as Galko in Please Tell Me! Galko-chan, Maika Sakuranomiya in Blend S, Special Week in Uma Musume Pretty Derby, and Senko in The Helpful Fox Senko-san.

In January 2020, she made her debut as a solo singer under Nippon Columbia.

Biography 
Waki was born in Tokyo. She has three older siblings. Although she had been interested in anime since she was young, she initially dreamed of becoming a flight attendant. She continued pursuing this dream after entering junior high school, although she gave up upon reaching high school because she felt that her English language skills were inadequate. At the age of 13, as her interest in anime grew, she instead decided to pursue a voice acting career.

Waki enrolled at the Tokyo Anime Voice Acting College after her third year of high school, where she would also work as a radio assistant personality while studying. After graduating from the college, she became affiliated with Haikyō. Her first voice acting role was as Sanae Katagiri in the video game and anime series The Idolmaster Cinderella Girls. That same year, she was cast as Eri Higuchi in the anime series Ani Tore! EX.

In 2016, Waki played the role of Galko in the anime series Please Tell Me! Galko-chan. She along with her co-stars also performed the show's opening theme "YPMA Girls".

In 2017, she played the role of Maika Sakuranomiya, the main character of the anime series Blend S; she and her co-stars Akari Kitō and Anzu Haruno performed the show's opening theme  and ending theme  under the name Blend A. She was also cast as the character Special Week in the multimedia franchise Uma Musume Pretty Derby.

In 2018, Waki played Special Week in the anime series of Uma Musume Pretty Derby. She also played the role of Rem Galleu in the anime series How Not to Summon a Demon Lord, and Elly in the anime series Ms. Vampire who lives in my neighborhood.

In 2019, she played Ao Horie in the anime series Ao-chan Can't Study!.  She also played the role of Senko in the anime series The Helpful Fox Senko-san, Shion Kujō in the anime series Are You Lost?, and Adele von Ascham in the anime series Didn't I Say to Make My Abilities Average in the Next Life?!.

In 2020, she played Akari in the anime series Shachibato! President, It's Time for Battle!,  Kusue Hakozaki in the anime series I'm Standing on a Million Lives, and Fina in the anime series Kuma Kuma Kuma Bear.

In 2021, she played Hinata Tachibana in the anime series Tokyo Revengers, Flatorte in the anime series I've Been Killing Slimes for 300 Years and Maxed Out My Level, Nagisa Minase in the anime series Girlfriend, Girlfriend, and Tsukimi Teruya in The Aquatope on White Sand.

In 2022, she will play Nanao Inusaka in the anime series Orient, and Dryad in the anime series My Isekai Life.

Filmography

Anime television series
2015
 The Idolmaster Cinderella Girls – Sanae Katagiri
 Magical Girl Lyrical Nanoha ViVid – Luka
 Anitore! EX – Eri Higuchi

2016
 Please Tell Me! Galko-chan – Galko
 BBK/BRNK – Dorsey, Domina

2017
 Blend S – Maika Sakuranomiya

2018
 Katana Maidens ~ Toji No Miko – Mai Yanase
 Uma Musume Pretty Derby – Special Week
 How Not to Summon a Demon Lord – Rem Galleu
 Ms. Vampire Who Lives in My Neighborhood – Erie

2019
 Mini Toji – Mai Yanase
 Ao-chan Can't Study! – Ao Horie
 The Helpful Fox Senko-san – Senko
 Are You Lost? – Shion Kujō
 Didn't I Say to Make My Abilities Average in the Next Life?! – Adele von Ascham / Mile
 Assassins Pride – Salacha Schicksal

2020
 My Next Life as a Villainess: All Routes Lead to Doom! – Anne Shelley
 Shachibato! President, It's Time for Battle! – Akari
 I'm Standing on a Million Lives – Kusue Hakozaki
 Kuma Kuma Kuma Bear – Fina
 Our Last Crusade or the Rise of a New World – Sisbell Lou Nebulis IX

2021
 Uma Musume Pretty Derby Season 2 – Special Week
 Ex-Arm – Elmira
 Farewell, My Dear Cramer – Ayumi Kishi
 How Not to Summon a Demon Lord Ω – Rem Galleu
 I've Been Killing Slimes for 300 Years and Maxed Out My Level – Flatorte
 Tokyo Revengers – Hinata Tachibana
 Girlfriend, Girlfriend – Nagisa Minase
 My Next Life as a Villainess: All Routes Lead to Doom! X – Anne Shelley
 The Aquatope on White Sand – Tsukimi Teruya
 I'm Standing on a Million Lives 2nd Season – Kusue Hakozaki
 180-Byō de Kimi no Mimi o Shiawase ni Dekiru ka? – Hikari Sawake
 Muv-Luv Alternative – Tо̄ko Kazama

2022
Orient – Nanao Inusaka
Girls' Frontline  – Steyr AUG
My Isekai Life – Dryad
Call of the Night – Hatsuka Suzushiro
Prima Doll – Haizakura
Hanabi-chan Is Often Late – Hanabi Hana Ariake
Beast Tamer – Kanade
Do It Yourself!! – Takumi
More Than a Married Couple, But Not Lovers – Natsumi Ōhashi
Delicious Party Pretty Cure - Maira Isuki

2023
The Iceblade Sorcerer Shall Rule the World – Rebecca Bradley
The Reincarnation of the Strongest Exorcist in Another World – Efa
Kuma Kuma Kuma Bear Punch! – Fina
The Café Terrace and Its Goddesses – Shiragiku Ono
My One-Hit Kill Sister – Sophie
Shangri-La Frontier – Saiga 0/Rei Saiga
The Kingdoms of Ruin – Doroka

Original net animations
Null & Peta (2019) – Null
Oshiete Hokusai!: The Animation (2021) – Tenkorin Okakura

Theatrical animation
The Orbital Children (2022) – Konoha Be Nanase

Video games
The Idolmaster Cinderella Girls – Sanae Katagiri

Shikigami Monogatari – Tsukito
8 Beat Story – Yukina Hoshimiya
Kirara Fantasia – Clea, Sakuranomiya Maika
Shoujo Kageki Revue Starlight: Re LIVE – Otonashi Ichie
Magia Record (2018) – Seika Kumi
Astral Chain – Olive
Girls' Frontline  – AK-12, Steyr AUG
Dead or Alive Xtreme Venus Vacation – Sayuri
Fate/Grand Order – Fairy Knight Tristan (Baobhan Sith)
Fire Emblem Heroes – Peony
Azur Lane – Suzuya, Kumano
Ash Arms – M7 Priest, M18 Hellcat
The Legend of Heroes: Trails into Reverie – Lapis Rosenberg
Touhou Cannonball –  Youmu Konpaku
Alchemy Stars – Clover, Pepi, Philyshy
The Legend of Heroes: Kuro no Kiseki II – Crimson Sin – Zita Asverl
Lackgirl I – Mizuha
Loop8: Summer of Gods – Konoha
Towa Tsugai – Flamingo

Discography

Studio albums

Singles

References

External links
Official music website 
Official agency profile 

1994 births
Living people
Japanese video game actresses
Japanese voice actresses
Tokyo Actor's Consumer's Cooperative Society voice actors
Voice actresses from Tokyo
21st-century Japanese actresses
Nippon Columbia artists
Japanese YouTubers